Islamic Movement can refer to Islam or Islamism in general, or to any of several religious or political organizations:

Islamic Movement of Afghanistan
National Islamic Movement of Afghanistan
Students Islamic Movement of India
Movement of 15 Khordad, AKA Islamic Movement of Iran
Islamic Movement in Israel
Islamic Movement of Bangladesh
Islamic Movement of Kurdistan 
Islamic Movement (Nigeria)
Islamic Movement of Tajikistan
East Turkestan Islamic Movement
Islamic Movement of Uzbekistan
Islamic State of Iraq and the Levant
"Global Islamic Movement", see Institute of Contemporary Islamic Thought